Divoká Šárka (Wild Šárka) is a nature reserve on the northwestern outskirts of Prague, the capital city of the Czech Republic.

Around the 6th century the Slavs came to this area. In the 7th to 9th centuries above the Džbán gorge was a Slavic settlement, with an area of approximately 20 ha (3 ha fortified settlement).

A gorge in the area is named after the female warrior Šárka, who, according to Ancient Bohemian Legends, threw herself to her death from its cliffs after betraying her lover Ctirad during the Maidens' War.

It is the closest site to the city where the black woodpecker lives.

There is a lake Džbán (The Pitcher) on the border of the Divoká Šárka reserve area and a public swimming pool located in the middle of the reserve. The water of the pool is supplied by clean and fresh water from the Šárka spring creek that passes through the park and the lake.

Photo

References

External links

 Divoká Šárka travel guide from expats.cz 

Geography of Prague
Nature reserves in the Czech Republic
Tourist attractions in Prague